The Boys in the Band is a 1970 American drama film directed by William Friedkin from a screenplay by Mart Crowley, based on Crowley's 1968 Off-Broadway play of the same name. It is among the early major American motion pictures to revolve around gay characters, often cited as a milestone in the history of queer cinema, and thought to be the first mainstream American film to use the swear word "cunt".

The ensemble cast, all of whom also played the roles in the play's initial stage run in New York City, includes Kenneth Nelson, Peter White, Leonard Frey, Cliff Gorman, Frederick Combs, Laurence Luckinbill, Keith Prentice, Robert La Tourneaux, and Reuben Greene. Model/actress Maud Adams has a brief cameo appearance in the opening montage, as does restaurateur Elaine Kaufman.

Plot
The film is set in an Upper East Side apartment in Manhattan in 1968.

Act I
Michael, a Roman Catholic, recovering alcoholic and sporadically-employed writer, is preparing to host a birthday party for one of his friends, Harold. Another friend, Donald, a self-described underachiever who has moved from the city, arrives and helps Michael prepare. Alan, Michael's (presumably straight) former college roommate, calls with an urgent need to see Michael. Michael reluctantly agrees and invites him to come over.

One by one, the guests arrive. Emory is a stereotypical flamboyant interior designer. Hank, a soon-to-be-divorced schoolteacher, and Larry, a fashion photographer, are a couple but struggling with monogamy. Bernard is an amiable black bookstore clerk. Alan calls again to inform Michael that he will not be coming after all, and the party continues in a festive manner. However, Alan arrives unexpectedly, throwing the gathering into turmoil.

"Cowboy," a hustler and Emory's "gift" to Harold, arrives. As tensions mount, Alan assaults Emory. During the ensuing chaos, Harold finally makes his grand appearance. In the middle of the scuffle, Michael impulsively begins drinking again. As the guests become more and more intoxicated, hidden resentments begin to surface.

Act II
Michael begins a telephone game with the objective for each guest to call the one person he truly believes he has loved. With each call, past scars and present anxieties are revealed. Bernard reluctantly attempts to call the son of his mother's employer, with whom he had had a sexual encounter as a teenager. Emory calls a dentist on whom he had had a crush while in high school. Both immediately regret the phone calls. Hank and Larry attempt to call each other via two phone lines in Michael's apartment.

Michael believes Alan is a closeted homosexual. Michael's plan to out Alan with the game appears to backfire when Alan calls his wife, not his male college friend, whom Michael had presumed to be Alan's lover. As the party ends and the guests depart, Michael collapses and sobs into Donald's arms. When he pulls himself together, it appears his life will remain very much the same.

Cast

 Kenneth Nelson as Michael
 Leonard Frey as Harold
 Cliff Gorman as Emory
 Laurence Luckinbill as Hank
 Frederick Combs as Donald
 Keith Prentice as Larry
 Robert La Tourneaux as Cowboy Tex
 Reuben Greene as Bernard
 Peter White as Alan McCarthy
 Maud Adams as photo model (uncredited) 
 Elaine Kaufman as extra/pedestrian (uncredited)

Production
Mart Crowley and Dominick Dunne set up the film version of the play with Cinema Center Films, owned by CBS Television. Crowley was paid $250,000 plus a percentage of the profits for the film rights; in addition to this, he received a fee for writing the script.

Crowley and Dunne originally wanted the play's director, Robert Moore, to direct the film but Gordon Stulberg, head of Cinema Center, was reluctant to entrust the job to someone who had never made a movie before. They decided on William Friedkin, who just made a film of The Birthday Party by Harold Pinter that impressed them.

Friedkin rehearsed for two weeks with the cast. He shot a scene that was offstage in the play where Hank and Larry kiss passionately. The actors who played them were reluctant to perform this on film, but eventually they did. However, Friedkin cut the scene during editing, feeling it was over-sensationalistic; nevertheless, he later admitted regretting that decision.

The bar scene in the opening was filmed at Julius in Greenwich Village. Studio shots were at the Chelsea Studios in New York City. According to commentary by Friedkin on the 2008 DVD release, Michael's apartment was inspired by the real-life Upper East Side apartment of actress Tammy Grimes. (Grimes was a personal friend of Mart Crowley.) Most of the patio scenes were filmed at Grimes' home. The actual apartment interior would not allow for filming, given its size and other technical factors, so a replica of Grimes' apartment was built on the Chelsea Studios sound stage, and that is where the interior scenes were filmed.

Songs featured in the film include "Anything Goes" performed by Harpers Bizarre during the opening credits, "Good Lovin' Ain't Easy to Come By" by Marvin Gaye and Tammi Terrell, "Funky Broadway" by Wilson Pickett, "(Love Is Like A) Heat Wave" by Martha and the Vandellas, and an instrumental version of Burt Bacharach's "The Look of Love".

Reception
The film has a 89% approval rating on the review aggregator Rotten Tomatoes, based on 19 reviews with an average rating of 7.2/10.

Contemporary critical reaction was, for the most part, cautiously favorable. Variety wrote it "drags" but thought it had "perverse interest." Time described it as a "humane, moving picture." The Los Angeles Times praised it as "unquestionably a milestone" but refused to run its ads. Among the major critics, Pauline Kael, who disliked Friedkin, was alone in finding absolutely nothing redeeming about it.

Vincent Canby of The New York Times observed "Except for an inevitable monotony that comes from the use of so many close-ups in a confined space, Friedkin's direction is clean and direct, and, under the circumstances, effective. All of the performances are good, and that of Leonard Frey, as Harold, is much better than good. He's excellent without disturbing the ensemble...Crowley has a good, minor talent for comedy-of-insult, and for creating enough interest, by way of small character revelations, to maintain minimum suspense. There is something basically unpleasant, however, about a play that seems to have been created in an inspiration of love-hate and that finally does nothing more than exploit its (I assume) sincerely conceived stereotypes."

In a San Francisco Chronicle review of a 1999 revival of the film, Edward Guthmann recalled "By the time Boys was released in 1970...it had already earned among gays the stain of Uncle Tomism." He called it "a genuine period piece but one that still has the power to sting. In one sense it's aged surprisingly little — the language and physical gestures of camp are largely the same — but in the attitudes of its characters, and their self-lacerating vision of themselves, it belongs to another time. And that's a good thing."

Bill Weber from Slant wrote in 2015: "The partygoers are caught in the tragedy of the pre-liberation closet, a more crippling and unforgiving one than the closets that remain."

The film was perceived in different ways throughout the gay community. There were those who agreed with most critics and believed The Boys was making great strides while others thought it portrayed a group of gay men wallowing in self-pity. There were even those who felt discouraged by some of the honesty in the production. One spectator wrote in 2018: "I was horrified by the depiction of the life that might befall me. I have very strong feelings about that play. It's done a lot of harm to gay people."

While not as acclaimed or commercially successful as director Friedkin's subsequent films, Friedkin considers this film to be one of his favorites. He remarked in an interview on the 2008 DVD for the movie: "It's one of the few films I've made that I can still watch."

Awards and nominations
Kenneth Nelson was nominated for the Golden Globe Award for New Star of the Year – Actor. The Producers Guild of America Laurel Awards honored Cliff Gorman and Leonard Frey as Stars of Tomorrow.

Home media
The Boys in the Band was released by MGM/CBS Home Video on VHS videocassette in October 1980, and was later re-released on CBS/Fox Video. It was later released on laserdisc.

The DVD, overseen by Friedkin, was released by Paramount Home Entertainment on November 11, 2008. Additional material includes an audio commentary; interviews with director Friedkin, playwright/screenwriter Crowley, executive producer Dominick Dunne, writer Tony Kushner, and two of the surviving cast members, Peter White and Laurence Luckinbill; and a retrospective look at both the off Broadway 1968 play and 1970 film.

On June 16, 2015, it was released on Blu-ray.

The 2011 documentary Making the Boys explores the production of the play and film in the context of its era.

Remake

Ryan Murphy produced a new film version of The Boys in the Band for Netflix in 2020. Joe Mantello, director of the play's 2018 Broadway revival, served as director of the new film version, which featured the entire Broadway revival cast, including Jim Parsons as Michael, Zachary Quinto as Harold, Matt Bomer as Donald, and Charlie Carver as Cowboy. The film was released by Netflix on September 30, 2020.

See also
 Boys in the Sand – a gay porn feature film released in 1971
 LGBT culture in New York City
 List of American films of 1970
 List of LGBTQ people from New York City

References

External links
 
 
 
 

1970 films
1970 drama films
1970 LGBT-related films
American drama films
American films based on plays
American LGBT-related films
Cinema Center Films films
1970s English-language films
Films directed by William Friedkin
Films set in Manhattan
Gay-related films
LGBT-related drama films
Films shot in New York City
Films set in 1968
1970s American films